Guy Burwell (born 1965) is an illustrator and designer based in Portland, Oregon.  He is primarily known for making limited edition rock concert posters. Despite the fact that rock posters are a predominantly American art form, Burwell's work is also highly appreciated and collected in Europe.

Burwell's art has been featured in numerous articles, as well as in the definitive books of the genre such as Gig Posters Vol. 1: Rock Show Art of the 21st Century by Clay Hayes and Art of Modern Rock: The Poster Explosion by Paul Grushkin and Dennis King. Guy Burwell also contributed art for the cover of Germany's Low Magazine, Vol. 6 of June 2010 and has been featured in Voice Magazine's 11th volume dedicated to Rock Art. He headlined the Röckaholics II Rock Art Show in Zurich, Switzerland alongside other famous gig poster artists and created the official show poster.

Notable Band Posters Illustrated
Phish
Mudhoney
Bright Eyes
Bad Religion
Jet
The Decemberists
John Doe
The Dandy Warhols
Yo La Tengo
Pernice Brothers
Melvins
Neko Case
Nada Surf
My Morning Jacket
Magnapop
Pearl Jam
Faith No More
Nine Inch Nails
Foo Fighters

References

External links
 GuyBurwell.com

American illustrators
Living people
1965 births